Ronnie "Diamond" Deleon, from Corpus Christi, Texas, is a two-time World Kickboxing Champion. He has won the following professional titles:

1987 W.K.A. Super Welterweight North American Champion 
1989 W.K.A. Super Welterweight World Champion
1993 K.I.C.K. Light Heavyweight North American Champion
1994 K.I.C.K. Light Heavyweight World Champion
1997 F.F.K.A. Light Heavyweight North American Champion

References 
Ronnie Deleon at worldclass-kickboxing.com

Year of birth missing (living people)
Living people
American male kickboxers
Welterweight kickboxers
Light heavyweight kickboxers
Kickboxers from Texas